Éamonn Fitzgerald (born 1948 in Killarney, County Kerry) is an Irish former sportsperson. He played Gaelic football with his local club Dr. Crokes and was a member of the Kerry senior inter-county team from 1972 until 1973.

At club level he won 3 Kerry Senior Football Championships, a Munster Senior Club Football Championship and an All-Ireland Senior Club Football Championship with East Kerry.

References

1948 births
Living people
Dr Crokes Gaelic footballers
Kerry inter-county Gaelic footballers
Gaelic football goalkeepers